Uģis is a Latvian masculine given name and may refer to:
Uģis Brūvelis (born 1971), Latvian race walker 
Uģis Lasmanis (born 1967), Latvian rower 
Uģis Prauliņš (born 1957), Latvian composer
Uģis Viļums (born 1979), Latvian basketball player
Uģis Žaļims (born 1986), Latvian bobsledder

References

Latvian masculine given names